Ceraeochrysa is green lacewing genus in the family Chrysopidae, containing the following species:

Ceraeochrysa acmon
Ceraeochrysa acutipuppis
Ceraeochrysa adornata
Ceraeochrysa anceps
Ceraeochrysa angulata
Ceraeochrysa ariasi
Ceraeochrysa arioles
Ceraeochrysa aroguesina
Ceraeochrysa berlandi
Ceraeochrysa caligata
Ceraeochrysa castilloi
Ceraeochrysa caucana
Ceraeochrysa cincta
Ceraeochrysa claveri
Ceraeochrysa costaricensis
Ceraeochrysa cubana
Ceraeochrysa discolor
Ceraeochrysa dislepis
Ceraeochrysa dolichosvela
Ceraeochrysa effusa
Ceraeochrysa elegans
Ceraeochrysa everes
Ceraeochrysa fairchildi
Ceraeochrysa falcifera
Ceraeochrysa fiebrigi
Ceraeochrysa gradata
Ceraeochrysa inbio
Ceraeochrysa indicata
Ceraeochrysa infausta
Ceraeochrysa josephina
Ceraeochrysa lateralis
Ceraeochrysa laufferi
Ceraeochrysa lineaticornis
Ceraeochrysa melaenopareia
Ceraeochrysa michaelmuris
Ceraeochrysa montoyana
Ceraeochrysa nigripedis
Ceraeochrysa nigripes
Ceraeochrysa paraguaria
Ceraeochrysa pittieri
Ceraeochrysa pseudovaricosa
Ceraeochrysa rafaeli
Ceraeochrysa reddyi
Ceraeochrysa reducta
Ceraeochrysa rochina
Ceraeochrysa sanchezi
Ceraeochrysa scapularis
Ceraeochrysa silvanoi
Ceraeochrysa smithi
Ceraeochrysa squalidens
Ceraeochrysa squama
Ceraeochrysa tauberae
Ceraeochrysa tenuicornis
Ceraeochrysa torresi
Ceraeochrysa tucumana
Ceraeochrysa valida

References

External links 

Chrysopidae